SimpleMind is a commercial mind mapping software application developed by ModelMaker Tools. The software provides ways for users to visualize information in mind maps and flowcharts. SimpleMind can be used to manage projects, organize information, and for brainstorming.

See also
List of concept- and mind-mapping software
Mind mapping
Visual thinking

References

External links 
official website

Mind-mapping software
Concept mapping software
Visual thinking